Xiao Tong (September/October 501 – 30 May 531), courtesy name Deshi, formally Crown Prince Zhaoming (昭明太子, literally "Accomplished and Understanding Crown Prince"), was a crown prince of the Chinese Liang Dynasty, posthumously honored as Emperor Zhaoming. He was the oldest son of Emperor Wu of Liang, whom he predeceased. Xiao Tong's enduring legacy is the literary compendium Wen Xuan (Selections of Refined Literature).

Birth and childhood
Xiao Tong was born to Xiao Yan, then a Southern Qi general nearing final victory in a civil war against the cruel and violent emperor Xiao Baojuan, in winter 501.  He was born at Xiao Yan's power base of Xiangyang, to Xiao Yan's concubine Ding Lingguang.  (Xiao Yan's wife Chi Hui had died in 499, and from that point on he had only concubines and never made any of them his wife.)  After Xiao Yan's victory later in 501, he forced Emperor He of Southern Qi, whom he had supported as a rival claimant to the Southern Qi throne, to yield the throne to him in 502, ending Southern Qi and starting Liang Dynasty (as its Emperor Wu).  The officials requested that he make Xiao Tong, then an infant, the crown prince, and while Emperor Wu initially declined on account that the empire had not been pacified, he did so in winter 502, when Xiao Tong was only one year old.  After Xiao Tong was created crown prince, his mother Consort Ding, while not made empress, was given a special status co-equal with her son.

Xiao Tong was said to be intelligent, kind, and obedient to his parents from his childhood.  As per customs of the time, in 506, he was housed in the Yongfu Mansion, the residence for the crown prince, in his childhood, but he missed his parents, and so every few days or so Emperor Wu would spend several days at Yongfu Mansion.  (Whether Consort Ding did the same is not recorded in history.)  In 515, he went through his rite of passage and was declared an adult, and Emperor Wu bestowed him a crown.

As adult
As Emperor Wu was an avid Buddhist, Xiao Tong also became one, and he studied sutras intently, often inviting Buddhist monks to his palace to preach and to discuss Buddhist doctrines. After his rite of passage, Emperor Wu also began to gradually have him handle more and more matters of state, becoming less involved in the day-to-day operations of the empire.

In 522, Xiao Tong's uncle Xiao Dan the Prince of Shixing died. By custom, a crown prince would not hold a mourning period for an uncle, but Xiao Tong believed this custom to be unfilial, and therefore requested the officials to further discuss the matter. After the official Liu Xiaochuo suggested that he hold a one-month mourning period, he agreed, and in fact made this a precedent for the Liang Dynasty.

During this period, Xiao Tong and others compiled a compendium of ancient poetry and texts, which he referred to as Wenxuan (文選, "Selections of Refined Literature"), which was later known after his death, by his posthumous name, as the Zhaoming Wenxuan. It is a work of historical importance, as it preserved many ancient texts which otherwise might have been lost.

In 526, Consort Ding grew ill, and Xiao Tong spent his days attending to her without rest.  She died in winter 526, and Xiao Tong was so saddened that he ate nothing.  It was after Emperor Wu tried to console him by pointing out that he should not harm his body and that he still had his father that Xiao Tong began to take porridge, but he ate nothing further.  He was described to be fairly obese until that point, but he lost a lot of weight during the mourning period for Consort Ding.

Death
The death of Consort Ding brought about a disastrous effect in Xiao Tong's relationship with his father, however. Xiao Tong sought out an appropriate place to bury Consort Ding, but while he was doing so, a landowner bribed the eunuch Yu Sanfu into convincing Emperor Wu that that piece of land would bring good fortune for the emperor, and so Emperor Wu bought the land and buried Consort Ding there.  However, once Consort Ding was buried, a Taoist monk informed Xiao Tong that he believed that the land would bring ill fortune for Consort Ding's oldest son—Xiao Tong.  Xiao Tong therefore allowed the monk to bury a few items intended to dissolve the ill fortune, such as wax gooses, at the position reserved for the oldest son.  Later on, when one of Xiao Tong's attendants, Bao Miaozhi, was squeezed out of Xiao Tong's inner circles by another attendant, Wei Ya, he, in resentment, reported to Emperor Wu that Wei had carried out sorcery on Xiao Tong's behalf.  When Emperor Wu investigated, waxed gooses were found, and Emperor Wu became surprised and angry, and wanted to investigate further.  He only stopped the investigation when he was advised to do so by the prime minister Xu Mian, executing only the Taoist monk who had suggested the burial of wax gooses.  Xiao Tong became humiliated in the affair, and was never able to clear himself completely in his father's eyes.

Xiao Tong died in 531.  Even when he was very ill, because he was afraid to make Emperor Wu be concerned about him, he still personally wrote submissions to his father.  After his death, Emperor Wu personally attended his wake and buried him at a tomb appropriate for an emperor. He also summoned Xiao Tong's oldest son, Xiao Huan the Duke of Huarong back to the capital Jiankang, preparing to create Xiao Huan crown prince to replace his father. However, still resentful over the wax goose affair, he hesitated for days without carrying out the creation, and finally did not do so.  Instead, against popular opinion, he created Xiao Tong's younger brother, also by Consort Ding, Xiao Gang crown prince.  In 551, when Xiao Gang, then emperor (as Emperor Jianwen) but under control and virtual house arrest by the general Hou Jing, Hou, to try to show off his power, deposed Emperor Jianwen and made Xiao Tong's grandson Xiao Dong the Prince of Yuzhang emperor.  It was then that Xiao Tong was posthumously honored an emperor.

Literary legacy
Xiao Tong is survived by his great literary compendium, the Wenxuan, an anthology of literature divided into 60 chapters. Chapter 29 preserves the Nineteen Old Poems, a major source for early Classical Chinese poetry. Xiao appears to consider these to be anonymous works, a view supported by modern scholarship, despite the claims of Xu Ling in his New Songs from the Jade Terrace.

Family
Consorts and Issue:
Empress Zhaode, of the Cai clan (昭德皇后 蔡氏)
Xiao Huan, Prince An of Yuzhang  (豫章安王 蕭歡, d. 20 January 541 ), first son
Empress Dowager Yuan, of the Gong clan (元太后龔氏, d.562)
Xiao Cha, Emperor Xuan (宣帝 蕭詧; 519–562), third son
Unknown
Xiao Yu, Prince Wuhuan of Hedong (河东武桓王 蕭譽, 519 – 22 June 550), second son
Xiao Pi, Prince of Wuchang (武昌郡王 蕭譬, d. 17 September 546), fourth son
Xiao Jian, Prince of Yiyang (義陽郡王 蕭鑒, d. 7 August 537), fifth son
Princess Luling (庐陵公主), first daughter
married Wang Kuan (王㳬)

Notes

References
Davis, A. R. (Albert Richard), Editor and Introduction (1970), The Penguin Book of Chinese Verse. (Baltimore: Penguin Books).

External links

 
 

Liang dynasty Buddhists
Liang dynasty imperial princes
501 births
531 deaths
People from Xiangyang
Chinese poetry anthologists
Heirs apparent who never acceded